The 1942 St. Louis Cardinals season was the team's 61st season in St. Louis, Missouri and its 51st season in the National League. The Cardinals won 106 games, the most in team history. They finished first in the National League, and met the New York Yankees in the World Series. They won the series in 5 games to capture their fourth championship.

Pitcher Mort Cooper won the MVP Award this year, with a 1.78 ERA, 22 wins, and 152 strikeouts.

This was Branch Rickey's 24th and final year with the Cardinals, the next year, he left to become the general manager of the Brooklyn Dodgers.

Offseason 
 December 1, 1941: Hank Gornicki was selected off waivers from the Cardinals by the Pittsburgh Pirates.
 Prior to 1942 season (exact date unknown)
Del Rice was signed as an amateur free agent by the Cardinals.

Regular season

Season standings

Record vs. opponents

Roster

Player stats

Batting

Starters by position
Note: Pos = Position; G = Games played; AB = At bats; H = Hits; Avg. = Batting average; HR = Home runs; RBI = Runs batted in

Other batters
Note: G = Games played; AB = At bats; H = Hits; Avg. = Batting average; HR = Home runs; RBI = Runs batted in

Pitching

Starting pitchers
Note: G = Games pitched; IP = Innings pitched; W = Wins; L = Losses; ERA = Earned run average; SO = Strikeouts

Other pitchers
Note: G = Games pitched; IP = Innings pitched; W = Wins; L = Losses; ERA = Earned run average; SO = Strikeouts

Relief pitchers
Note: G = Games pitched; W = Wins; L = Losses; SV = Saves; ERA = Earned run average; SO = Strikeouts

1942 World Series 

NL St. Louis Cardinals (4) vs. AL New York Yankees (1)

Farm system

References

External links
1942 St. Louis Cardinals at Baseball Reference
1942 St. Louis Cardinals  at Baseball Almanac

St. Louis Cardinals seasons
Saint Louis Cardinals season
National League champion seasons
World Series champion seasons
St Louis Cardinals